The Nicaraguan Campaign Medal is a campaign medal of the United States Navy which was authorized by Presidential Order of Woodrow Wilson on September 22, 1913.  A later medal, the Second Nicaraguan Campaign Medal was authorized by an act of the United States Congress on November 8, 1929.  The two medals were considered two separate awards, with the original medal being commonly referred to as the First Nicaraguan Campaign Medal.

First Nicaraguan Campaign Medal
The First Nicaraguan Campaign Medal was created to recognize those U.S. Navy personnel and U.S. Marines who had participated in amphibious actions in Nicaragua between 29 July and 14 November 1912. The following naval commands, and all embarked U.S. Marines, were eligible for the First Nicaraguan Campaign Medal:

  (gunboat)
  (armored cruiser)
  (protected cruiser)
  (armored cruiser)
  (protected cruiser)
  (stores ship)
  (armored cruiser)
  (protected cruiser)

The medal for the First Nicaraguan Campaign Medal displayed a volcano, rising from a lake, with the words “Nicaraguan Campaign” and the date 1912 on the edges of the medal.  The medal itself was suspended from a red ribbon with two thick blue stripes.  On the reverse of each medal was a Navy or Marine Corps crest, depending on the recipients branch of service.

The First Nicaraguan Campaign Medal was a one-time-only decoration and there were no devices or attachments authorized.

External links 

http://www.history.navy.mil/medals/2nic.htm

References

United States campaign medals
Nicaragua–United States relations